The 1960–61 Women's Basketball European Cup was the third edition of the competition. 1960 champion Daugava Riga beat Czechoslovakia's Slovan Orbis Prague in the final, becoming the first team to successfully defend their title.

This edition marked the first appearance of Morocco, Portugal and Spain in the competition. Israel and Switzerland were scheduled to take part, but both teams retired before they could make their debut. Yugoslavia was a noted absence, while France's Paris UC also retired after beating the 1st Qualification Round.

This edition saw the first match between two team from the same nation in the history of the competition, with a Daugava Riga – USK Tartu tie in the semifinals. Daugava and Tartu were respectively the champion and runner-up of the 1960 Soviet Championship.

First Qualification round

Second Qualification round

Quarter-finals

Semi-finals

Final

References 

Champions Cup
European
European
EuroLeague Women seasons